{{Infobox school
|name                   = St. John's College
|native_name            = பரி. யோவான் கல்லூரி
|latin_name             = 
|logo                   = St John's College Jaffna crest.png
|logo_size              = 150px
|seal_image             = 
|image                  = 
|alt                    = 
|caption                = 
|motto                  = |motto_translation      = Light Shines in the Darkness
|location               = 
|streetaddress          = Main Street, Chundikuli
|region                 = 
|city                   = Jaffna, Jaffna District
|state                  = 
|province               = Northern Province
|county                 = 
|postcode               = 
|postalcode             = 
|zipcode                = 40000
|country                = Sri Lanka
|country1               = 
|coordinates            = 
|pushpin_map            = Sri Lanka Jaffna Central
|pushpin_image          = 
|pushpin_mapsize        = 
|pushpin_map_alt        = 
|pushpin_map_caption    = Location in central Jaffna
|pushpin_label          = 
|pushpin_label_position = bottom
|schooltype             = 1AB
|fundingtype            = 
|type                   = Private
|religious_affiliation  = 
|religion               = Christianity
|denomination           = Anglicanism
|patron                 = 
|established            =
|founded                = 
|opened                 = 
|founder                = Joseph Knight
|status                 = 
|closed                 =
|locale                 = 
|schoolboard            = 
|district               = Jaffna Education Zone
|authority              = Church of Ceylon
|category               = 
|category_label         = 
|oversight              = 
|oversight_label        = 
|authorizer             = 
|superintendent         = 
|trustee                = 
|specialist             = 
|session                = 
|schoolnumber           = 1001029
|school code            = 
|president              = 
|chair                  = 
|chairman               = 
|chairperson            = 
|dean                   = 
|administrator          = 
|rector                 = 
|director               = 
|principal              = V. S. B. Thuseetharan
|campus director        = 
|headmistress           = 
|headmaster             = A. H. Gnanarajan
|head of school         = 
|head_teacher           = V. Kumanan
|executive_headteacher  = 
|acting_headteacher     = 
|head                   = 
|head_label             = 
|chaplain               = S. S. Jebaselvan 
|custodian              = 
|staff                  = 
|faculty                = 
|teaching_staff         = 95
|employees              = 
|key_people             = 
|grades                 = 1-13
|years                  = 
|gender                 = Boys
|lower_age              = 
|upper_age              = 
|age range              = 5-18
|enrolment              = 
|enrollment             = 
|enrollment_as_of       = 
|students               = 
|sixth_form_students    = 
|pupils                 = 
|other                  = 
|other_grade_enrollment = 
|other_grade_label      = 
|international_students = 
|classes                = 
|avg_class_size         = 
|ratio                  = 
|system                 = 
|classes_offered        = 
|medium                 = 
|language               = Tamil, English
|schedtyp               = 
|schedule               = 
|hours_in_day           = 
|classrooms             = 
|campuses               = 
|campus                 = 
|campus size            = 
|area                   = 
|campus type            = 
|houses                 = Handy (green)Johnstone (blue)Pargiter (red)Peto (purple)Thompson (yellow) 
|colours                =
|colors                 = 
|slogan                 = 
|song                   = 
|fightsong              = 
|athletics              = 
|conference             = 
|sports                 = 
|mascot                 = 
|mascot image           = 
|nickname               = 
|team_name              = 
|rival                  = 
|accreditation          = 
|ranking                = 
|national_ranking       = 
|testname               = 
|testaverage            = 
|SAT                    = 
|ACT                    = 
|bar pass rate          = 
|roll                   = 2,130
|decile                 = 
|publication            = 
|newspaper              = 
|yearbook               = 
|products               = 
|endowment              = 
|budget                 = 
|fees                   = 
|tuition                = 
|revenue                = 
|communities            = 
|feeders                = 
|main feeder school for = 
|graduates              =
|affiliations           = 
|alumni                 = 
|nobel_laureates        = 
|information            = 
|homepage               = 
|url                    = 
|website                = 
|footnotes              = 
|picture                = 
|picture_caption        =  Knight block
}}
St. John's College ( Ceṉ. Yōvāṉ Kallūri, SJC) is a private school in Jaffna, Sri Lanka. Founded in 1823 by British Anglican missionaries, it is one of Sri Lanka's oldest schools.

History
In 1817 the Anglican Church Mission Society (CMS) approved the establishment of missions in Ceylon. On 20 December 1817 four clergymen – Joseph Knight, Samuel Lambrick, Robert Major and Benjamin Ward – and their wives left England and sailed to Ceylon on board the Vittoria''. They arrived in late June 1818. Knight went to Jaffna, Lambrick went to Colombo, Major and his wife went to Galle and Ward and his wife to Trincomalee. Knight started his missionary work in 1818 in Nallur.

The Nallur English Seminary was established in March 1823 by Knight. The school had only 7 students and was located in Knight's bungalow. In 1845 the school was relocated to Chundikuli and renamed the Chundikuli Seminary.

In the same year the Church Mission Society took over the old Portuguese St. John the Baptist church. In 1846 the school moved into a hall next to the church. The church was demolished in 1859 and replaced by the current church.

The school was renamed St. John's College in 1891. The free education system was introduced by the government in 1945 but SJC chose to remain outside the system. In 1951 SJC joined the free education system. Most private schools in Ceylon were taken over by the government in 1960 but SJC chose to remain as a private and non-fee levying school.

SJC's principal C. E. Anandarajah was shot dead on 26 June 1985 in Jaffna. It is alleged that the Liberation Tigers of Tamil Eelam assassinated Anandarajah for organising a cricket match with the Sri Lankan military.

Big Match

SJC play Jaffna Central College in annual cricket match known as the Battle of the North or the Battle of the Blues. The first match took place in 1904.

Principals

 1823-1825 Rev. Joseph Knight
 1825-1839 Rev. W. Adley
 1839-1841 Rev. F. W. Taylor
 1841-1846 Rev. I. T. Johnstone
 1846-1866 Rev. R. Pargiter
 1866-1874 Rev. T. Good
 1874-1878 Rev. D. Wood
 1878-1879 Rev. E. Blackmore
 1879-1889 Rev. G. T. Fleming
 1889-1892 Rev. C. C. Handy (Acting)
 1892-1895 Rev. J. W. Fall
 1895-1899 Rev. I. Carter
 1899-1900 Rev. R. W. Ryde
 1900-1919 Rev. Jacob Thomson
 1919 Rev. K. C. Mc Pherson (Acting)
 1920-1940 Rev. Henry Peto
 1940-1957 Rev. J. T. Arulanantham
 1957-1959 P. T. Mathai
 1959-1966 A. W. Rajasekeram
 1967-1976 K. Pooranampillai
 1976-1985 C. E. Anandarajah
 1985-1987 T. Gunaseelan
 1987 K. Pooranampillai
 1988-1993 Dr. E. S. Thevasagayam
 1990-1993 S. Thanapalan (Acting)
 1993-2006 S. Thanapalan 
 2006-2019 Rev. N. J. Gnanaponrajah
 2019 Ven. Samuel J. Ponniah (Acting)
 2020- V. S. B. Thuseetharan

Notable alumni

See also
 List of schools in Northern Province, Sri Lanka

Notes

References

External links

 St. John's College
 Old Boys Association
 Old Boys Association, Sydney, Australia
 Old Boys Association, Victoria, Australia
 Old Boys Association, South Sri Lanka
 Chundikuli St. John's Past Pupils Association, UKA

 
1823 establishments in Ceylon
Boys' schools in Sri Lanka
Church of Ceylon schools in the Diocese of Colombo
Educational institutions established in 1823
Private schools in Sri Lanka
Schools in Jaffna